Uma is a 2013 Nepali drama film directed by Tsering Rhitar Sherpa. It stars Reecha Sharma, Saugat Malla, Mithila Sharma in the lead roles, alongside Dayahang Rai and Nischal Basnet. The film is about the Nepalese Civil War.

Synopsis 
Milan (Saugat Malla) is a police officer in the early 2000s, during the Nepalese Civil War, while Uma (Reecha Sharma), his sister, eventually joins the Maoist movement. When Milan learns about her involvement with the Maoist, the story takes a turning point.

Cast 
 Reecha Sharma as Uma
 Saugat Malla as Milan
 Mithila Sharma as Mother
 Dayahang Rai as Comrade Sonam
 Nischal Basnet as Bhuwan Hamal
 Pramod Agrahari as Vineet

Reception 
Shreya Paudel of The Kathmandu Post praised the director writing "[he] shot the movie beautifully with stunning camera work and angles". Saugat Malla was nominated for Best Actor in a Leading Role (Male) by the NFDC National Film Award.

References

External links 

 

2013 films
Nepalese Civil War films
2010s Nepali-language films
Cultural depictions of Nepalese women